This is a list of Rolls-Royce branded motor cars and includes vehicles manufactured by:

Rolls-Royce Limited (1906–1973)
Rolls-Royce Motors (1973–2003), which was created as a result of the demerger of Rolls-Royce Limited in 1973. Vickers plc owned Rolls-Royce Motors between 1980 and 1998. Volkswagen AG acquired Rolls-Royce Motors in 1998 and renamed the firm Bentley Motors Limited in 2003. Bentley Motors Limited is the direct successor of Rolls-Royce Motors and its predecessor entities and owns historical Rolls-Royce assets such as the Crewe factory, pre-2003 vehicle designs and the L Series V8 engine.
Rolls-Royce Motor Cars, a subsidiary of BMW AG established in 1998 that began production of vehicles in 2003.

Vehicles

Rolls-Royce Limited vehicles
 1904–06 10 hp
 1905–05 15 hp
 1905–08 20 hp
 1905–07 30 hp
 1905–06 V-8
 1906–25 40/50 Silver Ghost
 1922–29 Twenty
 1925–29 40/50 Phantom 
 1929–36 20/25
 1929–35 Phantom II
 1936–38 25/30
 1936–39 Phantom III
 1938–39 Wraith
 1946–59 Silver Wraith
 1949–55 Silver Dawn
 1950–56 Phantom IV
 1955–66 Silver Cloud
 1959–68 Phantom V
 1965–80 Silver Shadow/Silver Wraith II
 1968–91 Phantom VI
 1971–96 Corniche
 1980–2000 Silver Spirit/Silver Spur

Bentley models (from 1933)
 1933–37 Bentley 3½ L
 1936–38 Bentley 4¼ L
 1940–40 Bentley 4¼ L Mark V

Rolls-Royce Motors vehicles
 1975–86 Camargue
 1980–2000 Silver Spirit/Silver Spur

Bentley models were produced mostly in parallel with the above cars. The Bentley Continental coupés (produced in various forms from the mid-1950s to the mid-1960s) did not have Rolls-Royce equivalents. Rolls-Royce Phantom limousines were also produced.

 1998–2002 Silver Seraph/Park Ward
 2000–02 Corniche V

Rolls-Royce Motor Cars vehicles
 2003–17 Phantom VII
 2007–16 Phantom Drophead Coupé
 2008–16 Phantom Coupé
 2010–present Ghost
 2013–22 Wraith
 2016–22 Dawn
 2017 Sweptail (one-off) 
 2017–present Phantom VIII
 2018–present Cullinan
 2021–present Rolls-Royce Boat Tail (2/3 made)
 2023 Rolls-Royce Spectre (electric)

See also
FAB 1
The Yellow Rolls-Royce

Gallery

References